Zandvoortse Basketballvereniging The Lions, or simply The Lions, is a Dutch amateur basketball club based in Zandvoort.

History
The Lions was active as a professional team from the late 1960s until the middle 1970s in the Dutch first division, the Dutch Basketball League. The club, under the sponsorship name Mars Energie Stars, won the national cup (so called NBB-Beker) in 1972 defeated Factotum Punch 86–84 in the final that held in Haarlem. Also The Lions, had played once again in the 1969 NBB-Beker final where they lost to Flamingo's Haarlem, 37–52 in Utrecht. The 1973–74 season as Typsoos Lions  the club ranked 4th in the league and won the right to participate in the 1974–75 FIBA Korać Cup. Typsoos Lions was drawn to play in the first round against Bosna and eliminated with an aggregate score 163–201 (81–79 home win and 82–122 defeat in Sarajevo).

Honours and achievements
Dutch Cup
 Winners (1): 1971–72
 Runners-up (1): 1968–69

European record

Notes

References

External links
 Official site

Basketball teams in the Netherlands
Basketball teams established in 1965
Former Dutch Basketball League teams
Sports clubs in North Holland
Sport in Zandvoort